Veeramani is a 1994 Indian Tamil-language action film directed by Prem Menon. The film stars himself and Yuvarani, with Prakash, Vinu Chakravarthy, V. K. Ramasamy, Jai Ganesh and Charle playing supporting roles. It was released on 16 September 1994.

Plot 

The film begins with the murder of a scientist. The superintendent of police Veeramani catches the culprit. During the enquiry, the culprit Gautham reveals everything. Gautham was, in fact, a talented sprinter but jobless, he needed money for his father's surgery. So Shaktiman hired him to kill the scientist. Shaktiman is the leader of a terrorist group and he is also a fake swami. In the meantime, the journalist Rakeswari falls in love with Veeramani. The rest of the film is a cat-and-mouse game between Shaktiman and Veeramani.

Cast 

Prem Menon as Veeramani
Yuvarani as Rakeswari
Prakash as Shaktiman
Vinu Chakravarthy as Chief Minister
V. K. Ramasamy as Krishnamurthy
Jai Ganesh as Rangaraj
Charle as Singaravelan
Babloo Prithiveeraj as Gautham
Vasanth as Nagarajan
Bharath as Bharath
Peeli Sivam
Kokila as Kokila
Kavyasree
Vaishnavi as Shanthi
Master Udayaraj as Kannan
Baboos
Gemini Ganesan in a guest appearance
Sadhana in a special appearance

Soundtrack 
The music was composed by Ekandhan, with lyrics written by Vaali.

Reception 
Malini Mannath of The Indian Express said, "the screenplay is weak, some of the key characters [...] and situations [...] are not handled convincingly. Individual shots seem to be well-planned and sickly executed, and there are some good moments in the film" like the climax. Kalki said .

References

External links 
 

1990s Tamil-language films
1994 action films
1994 films
Indian action films